Hydrophis inornatus, commonly known as the plain sea snake, is a species of venomous sea snake in the family Elapidae.

Distribution
South China Sea (Philippines: Panay, etc.), Sri Lanka, 
Australia (North Territory, Western Australia?).

Description
Hydrophis inornatus is bluish gray dorsally. The lips, lower sides, and venter are white. The tail is dark bluish gray, with three or four narrow white crossbands.

Head elongate, snout somewhat flattened. Eye large, located above the fourth upper labial. Pupil round. Neck moderately thick.

Dorsal scales hexagonal, with a central keel.

Ventrals distinct, but only slightly larger than the contiguous scales. The type specimen, a male, has 240 ventrals.

References

Further reading
 McDowell, S.B. 1972. The genera of sea-snakes of the Hydrophis group (Serpentes: Elapidae). Trans. Zool. Soc. Lond 32: 189–247.
 Rasmussen, A.R. 1989. An analysis of Hydrophis ornatus (Gray), H. lamberti Smith, and H. inornatus (Gray) (Hydrophiidae, Serpentes) based on samples from various localities, with remarks on feeding and breeding biology of H. ornatus. Amphibia-Reptilia 10: 397–417.
 Rasmussen, A.R. 1994. A cladistic analysis of Hydrophis subgenus Chitulia (McDowell, 1972) (Serpentes, Hydrophiidae). Zoological Journal 111 (2): 161.

inornatus
Reptiles of Western Australia
Reptiles described in 1849
Taxa named by John Edward Gray
Snakes of Australia